Wêr bisto (English: Where are you) is the debut single by Frisian band Twarres. It won the audience award at the 1999 Frisian Song Contest, and was released as a single on 10 July 2000, and became the first Frisian-language single to reach number one in the Dutch Top 40.

References

2000 singles
Pop songs